Kenmore was a railway station on the Crookwell railway line, New South Wales, Australia. The station opened in 1902 with the opening of the line, and consisted of a 100 ft platform on the down side of the line. It gained its name from Kenmore a small village in Perthshire, Scotland, and was located adjacent to Kenmore Hospital. A 275 ft loop siding was constructed with the line, subsequently shortened in 1934 to 175 ft. In 1942, and additional siding was added. Passenger services ceased in 1974, and in 1975, the station and facilities closed and the platform was subsequently demolished. The line closed to goods traffic in 1984. The closed rail-line and loop remain in-situ.

References

Disused regional railway stations in New South Wales
Railway stations in Australia opened in 1902
Railway stations closed in 1975